The 863rd Engineer Battalion is an engineer battalion of the United States Army first formed in 1942. The 863rd participated in World War II.

Lineage and honors 
 Constituted 15 July 1942 in the Army of the United States as the 1st Battalion, 922nd Engineer Regiment, Aviation
 Activated 1 August 1942 at Geiger Field, Washington, as the 1st Battalion, 922nd Engineer Aviation Regiment
 Redesignated 1 February 1942 as the 863rd Engineer Aviation Battalion
 Inactivated 15 June 1946 in the Philippine Islands
 Allotted 18 February 1949 to the Organized Reserve Corps
 Activated 24 March 1949 with headquarters at Chicago, Illinois
 (Organized Reserve Corps redesignated 9 July 1952 as the Army Reserve)
 Inactivated 17 January 1955 at Chicago, Illinois
 Redesignated 18 August 1959 as the 863rd Engineer Battalion
 Activated 1 October 1959 with headquarters at Aurora, Illinois

Campaign participation credit 
World War II
 New Guinea
 Leyte
 Luzon
Operation Enduring Freedom
Operation Inherent Resolve

Decorations 
 Philippine Presidential Unit Citation, Streamer embroidered 17 October 1944 to 4 July 1945

 Valorous Unit Award, Medal awarded to 863rd Engineer Battalion (Combat) (Heavy) for its performance in support of Task Force Strike, 2nd BCT, 101st Airborne Division throughout RC-South, Afghanistan, Operation Enduring Freedom; from 20 June 2010 to 15 April 2011.

Controversy
Operation Enduring Freedom
 Controversy briefly erupted shortly after ending operations in Afghanistan (August 2011) when the 863rd Engineer Battalion was accused of abandoning one of its attached subordinate units to adverse weather conditions during the demobilization process in order to allow its organic personnel not to be inconvenienced by Hurricane Irene.

References

link title

Engineer battalions of the United States Army